Pankaj Roy (31 May 1928 – 4 February 2001) was an Indian cricketer and former national cricket team captain. He was right-handed opening batsman, he is best known for establishing the world record opening partnership of 413 runs, together with Vinoo Mankad, against New Zealand at Chennai. The record stood until 2008. In 2000, he was appointed as the Sheriff of Kolkata. He has been honoured with the Padma Shri. His nephew Ambar Roy and son Pranab Roy also played Test cricket for India. He was a student of Vidyasagar College.

First-class career
Roy played domestic cricket in India for the Bengal cricket team. He scored a century on his first-class debut in 1946–47 and went on to score 33 hundreds, scoring a total of 11868 first class runs at 42.38.

Test career
When England toured India in 1951, Roy was selected for the Indian squad and made his Test debut at Delhi. Despite making just 12 in his debut innings he scored 2 centuries in the series. The following summer he toured England and had a contrasting series, making 5 ducks in his 7 innings, including Frank Tyson's debut first class wicket. This tally included a pair at Old Trafford. He was among the four victims (others being Datta Gaekwad, Vijay Manjrekar and Madhav Mantri) in India's miserable 0–4 start in the second innings of the Headingley Test of 1952 with Fred Trueman playing havoc. He would hit five Test centuries for India, with a top score of 173.

He captained India in a Test match in England in 1959, which India lost.

References

External links

 "Extracting history from myth" by Suresh Menon

1928 births
2001 deaths
Bengali cricketers
India Test cricket captains
India Test cricketers
Indian cricketers
East Zone cricketers
Bengal cricketers
Mumbai cricketers
Indian Universities cricketers
Recipients of the Padma Shri in sports
Cricketers from Kolkata
Sheriffs of Kolkata